The 1982 Soviet football championship was the 51st seasons of competitive football in the Soviet Union. Dinamo Minsk won the Top League championship becoming the Soviet domestic champions for the first time.

Honours

Notes = Number in parentheses is the times that club has won that honour. * indicates new record for competition

Soviet Union football championship

Top League

First League

Match for 1st place
 [Nov 16, Simferopol]
 Žalgiris        1-0 Nistru

Second League (finals)

 [Oct 26 – Nov 19]

Finals 1

Finals 2

Finals 3

Top goalscorers

Top League
 Andrei Yakubik (Pakhtakor Tashkent) – 23 goals

First League
Georgiy Kolyadok (Kolos Nikopol) – 26 goals

References

External links
 1982 Soviet football championship. RSSSF